AP-1 complex subunit mu-2 is a protein that in humans is encoded by the AP1M2 gene.

Function 

This gene encodes a subunit of the heterotetrameric adaptor-related protein complex 1 (AP-1), which belongs to the adaptor complexes medium subunits family. This protein is capable of interacting with tyrosine-based sorting signals.

Interactions 

AP1M2 has been shown to interact with AP2B1.

References

Further reading

External links